Ilham Yadullayev (born 17 September 1975) is an Azerbaijani former football defender, and current manager of Sumgayit FK.

International career
Yadullayev made 35 appearances for the Azerbaijan national football team from 1998 to 2004.

Managerial career

On 19 June 2014 Yadullayev was appointed as manager of Sumgayit on a one-year contract.

National team statistics

References

External links
 
 
 

1975 births
Living people
Azerbaijani footballers
Azerbaijan international footballers
Azerbaijani expatriate footballers
Expatriate footballers in Iran
Expatriate footballers in Ukraine
Azerbaijani expatriate sportspeople in Ukraine
FC Volyn Lutsk players
SC Tavriya Simferopol players
Sanat Naft Abadan F.C. players
Ukrainian Premier League players
Association football defenders